The West Branch Tenmile River is a  tributary of the Tenmile River in western Maine. It is part of the Saco River watershed, flowing to the Atlantic Ocean.

The West Branch rises near the northern boundary of the town of Porter and flows east, entering the town of Hiram just before its mouth at the Tenmile River.

See also
List of rivers of Maine

References

Maine Streamflow Data from the USGS
Maine Watershed Data From Environmental Protection Agency

Rivers of Maine
Saco River
Rivers of Oxford County, Maine